Mariya Ryemyen (born 2 August 1987, Makiivka) is a Ukrainian sprint athlete who specializes in the 100 metres. Ryemyen was part (with Nataliya Pohrebnyak, Olesya Povh and Yelizaveta Bryzhina) of the Ukrainian women's 4 × 100 m that won gold during the 2010 European Athletics with 42.29 – the fastest time in the world that year.

Career
She finished seventh at the 2009 European U23 Championships. She also competed at the 2010 World Indoor Championships without reaching the final.

In the 4 x 100 metres relay she competed at the 2009 World Championships without reaching the final. At the 2009 European U23 Championships the Ukrainian team failed to finish the race.

Her personal best times are 7.15 seconds in the 60 metres (indoor), achieved in March 2011 in Paris; and 11.27 seconds in the 100 metres, achieved in June 2011 in Montreuil-sous-Bois.

In 2011, she competed for Fenerbahçe Athletics in Turkey. At the 2012 Olympics Maria represented the Armed Forces of Ukraine and the sports club "Ukraina". At the 2012 Olympic Games in London she and her teammates Olesya Povh, Hrystyna Stuy and Yelizaveta Bryzghina took the bronze medals in the 4 x 100 metres relay by setting a new national record.

She served a two-year doping ban for the use of a prohibited substance, methandienone. The ban lasted from 10 January 2014 to 2 March 2016.

References

1987 births
Living people
Sportspeople from Makiivka
Ukrainian female sprinters
Fenerbahçe athletes
Olympic athletes of Ukraine
Armed Forces sports society (Ukraine) athletes
Olympic bronze medalists for Ukraine
Medalists at the 2012 Summer Olympics
Athletes (track and field) at the 2012 Summer Olympics
Athletes (track and field) at the 2016 Summer Olympics
World Athletics Championships medalists
European Athletics Championships medalists
Doping cases in athletics
Ukrainian sportspeople in doping cases
Olympic bronze medalists in athletics (track and field)
Universiade medalists in athletics (track and field)
Universiade gold medalists for Ukraine
Medalists at the 2013 Summer Universiade
Olympic female sprinters